Ilja Syrovatko is a Russian professional basketball player, who plays in Dynamo Moscow.

References

Year of birth missing (living people)
Living people
Russian men's basketball players
BC Dynamo Moscow players
Place of birth missing (living people)